is a member of the Japanese idol girl group SKE48. She is a member of SKE48's Team KII, and a former member of AKB48.

Career 
Furuhata was born in Aichi Prefecture, and passed SKE48's 5th generation auditions in October 2011. Her audition song was SKE48's Aozora Kataomoi. Her debut was on November 26, 2011. On August 29, 2012, she was promoted to Team E. She held a concurrent position in AKB48's Team K from April 2013 to February 2014.

Her first SKE48 Senbatsu was for the single Utsukushii Inazuma.

In February 2014, during the AKB48 Group Shuffle, it was announced she would be transferred to Team KII and her concurrent position would be shifted to Team A. In the 2014 general elections, she ranked for the first time, placing 55th with 14,634 votes.

On 26 March 2015, it was announced that she would be relieved of her concurrent position in AKB48.

Furuhata released three music videos in collaboration with the metal band Bridear on April 4, 2020, where they covered songs from SKE48 and her 2018 solo EP. The two acts were originally scheduled to perform together in Tokyo and Osaka, but the concerts were cancelled due to the COVID-19 pandemic in Japan.

Appearances

TV dramas
 Yamegoku: Yakuza Yamete Itadakimasu Episode 3 (TBS, 2015), Ai Kazami
 Majisuka Gakuen 4 (2015) as Diva
 Majisuka Gakuen 5 (2015) as Snake
 AKB Horror Night: Adrenaline's Night Ep.4 - Wrong Number (2015)
 Gekijōrei Kara no Shōtaijō Episode 5 (2015) as Haruka Ishizuka
 AKB Love Night: Love Factory Ep.14 - Right Hook Girlfriend (2016) as Misa

Stages
 Musical AKB49: Ren'ai Kinshi Jōrei (14–15 March 2015, Chunichi Theatre), Minori Urakawa/Minoru Urayama
 Hana Yori Dango The Musical (January–February 2016), Shizuka Tōdou

Anime
 Kizuna no Allele (2023) as Zoe

Discography

Solo singles
  (October 13, 2017) Labels: Showroom Records
  (August 24, 2022) Labels: Zest

SKE48

Singles

Sub-Unit Singles
 Koppu no Naka no Komorebi
 "Aishiteru to ka, Aishiteta to ka" / Furumarion
 "Otanoshimi wa ashita kara" / Aichi Toyota Senbatsu

Albums

AKB48

Singles

Albums

External links
 SKE48 Official Profile  
 Official Blog 
 Nao Furuhata on Google+

References

1996 births
Living people
Japanese idols
Japanese women pop singers
Musicians from Aichi Prefecture
SKE48 members
AKB48 members
21st-century Japanese women singers
21st-century Japanese singers